The Aaron Aldrich House is a historic house located at 30663 Lake Road in Bay Village, Ohio. It is locally significant as an exceptionally well-preserved example of a Federal period farmhouse.

Description and history 
The -story, Federal style house was built in 1829 by Rhode Island native Aaron Aldrich, a skilled craftsman, and one of the towns early settlers. It has historically been used as a single dwelling. It was listed on the National Register of Historic Places on December 4, 1978.

References 

Houses in Cuyahoga County, Ohio
Houses on the National Register of Historic Places in Ohio
National Register of Historic Places in Cuyahoga County, Ohio
Houses completed in 1829
Federal architecture in Ohio